Nicole Koolhaas (born 31 January 1991) is a Dutch volleyball player, who plays as a Center. She was a member of the Women's National Team. She plays for Bartoccini Perugia Volley.

She participated in the 2010 FIVB World Grand Prix, 2010 FIVB Volleyball Women's World Championship, 2014 FIVB World Grand Prix, 2015 Montreux Volley Masters , 2015 FIVB World Grand Prix,  2016 FIVB World Grand Prix, 2017 FIVB Volleyball World Grand Prix, 2017 Montreux Volley Masters, 2017 Women's European Volleyball Championship, and 2018 FIVB Volleyball Women's Nations League.

References

External links
FIVB profile
https://elteevolley.com/player/nicole-koolhaas/
https://www.cev.eu/Competition-Area/PlayerDetails.aspx?TeamID=9733&PlayerID=7839&ID=837

1991 births
Living people
Dutch women's volleyball players
Dutch expatriate sportspeople in France
Dutch expatriate sportspeople in Italy
Dutch expatriate sportspeople in Romania
Dutch expatriate sportspeople in Sweden
Dutch expatriate sportspeople in Switzerland
People from Hoorn
Expatriate volleyball players in Romania 
European Games competitors for the Netherlands
Volleyball players at the 2015 European Games
Middle blockers
Expatriate volleyball players in France
Expatriate volleyball players in Italy
Expatriate volleyball players in Switzerland
Sportspeople from North Holland